Willie Pless (born February 21, 1964) is a former Canadian football linebacker in the Canadian Football League. He played for the Toronto Argonauts, BC Lions, Edmonton Eskimos, and Saskatchewan Roughriders, winning the 1993 Grey Cup with the Eskimos. He was inducted into the Canadian Football Hall of Fame in 2005.

College career
Pless played his college football at the University of Kansas. As a Jayhawk starter for only three years (1983–1985) he amassed an amazing 633 tackles. This is not recognized as a record, as the NCAA officially counted tackles starting in 2000, but the present leader (Rod Davis) has only 526. Being 5 feet 10 inches tall, 210 pounds, Pless was not drafted by the NFL. He would later (in 1990) try out for the New Orleans Saints and Kansas City Chiefs, but otherwise, his entire 14 year, 250 game, career was played in Canada. Willie was an All Big Eight Academic first team and was elected as the all-time best linebacker in the history of Big Eight after it became the Big Twelve.

Professional career
Willie Pless may be the best defensive player ever to play in the CFL. He played for 4 teams: Toronto Argonauts for 4 years (1986–1989), B.C. Lions for 1990, Edmonton Eskimos for (1991–1998) and finally the Saskatchewan Roughriders (1999). He holds the league record for most tackles (1,241). He also had 84 quarterback sacks, 39 interceptions, 39 fumble recoveries, played in 18 playoff games and three Grey Cups, winning one championship (the 81st Grey Cup game). He won the CFL's Most Outstanding Defensive Player Award five times and was an all star 11 times.

Honours and awards
  CFL outstanding defensive player: 1992, 1994, 1995, 1996, 1997
  West Division outstanding defensive player: 1992, 1994, 1995, 1996, 1997
  East Division outstanding rookie: 1986
  CFL All-Star: 1986, 1988, 1990, 1991, 1992, 1993, 1994, 1995, 1996, 1997, 1998.
  West Division All-Star: 1994, 1996, 1997, 1998, 1999
  North Division All-Star: 1995
  B.C. Lions outstanding player: 1990
  Edmonton Eskimos outstanding player: 1993, 1994, 1995, 1996
  Toronto Argonauts outstanding defensive player: 1986, 1988
  B.C. Lions outstanding defensive player: 1990
  Edmonton Eskimos outstanding defensive player: 1991, 1992, 1993, 1994, 1995, 1996, 1997
  Saskatchewan Roughriders outstanding defensive player: 1999
  Toronto Argonauts outstanding rookie: 1986
  Grey Cup participation: 1987, 1993, 1996
  Grey Cup victories: 1993

He is a member of the University of Kansas Sports Hall of Fame and was inducted into the Canadian Football Hall of Fame in 2005. In November, 2006, Willie Pless was voted one of the CFL's Top 50 players (#16) of the league's modern era by Canadian sports network The Sports Network/TSN.

Personal life
Pless has settled in Edmonton and runs a personal trainer business.

Notes

1964 births
Living people
American players of Canadian football
BC Lions players
Canadian Football Hall of Fame inductees
Canadian Football League Most Outstanding Defensive Player Award winners
Canadian football linebackers
Edmonton Elks players
Kansas Jayhawks football players
Sportspeople from Anniston, Alabama
Saskatchewan Roughriders players
Toronto Argonauts players
University of Kansas alumni
Canadian Football League Rookie of the Year Award winners